Nachi Cocom (? - 1562), known to Spanish conquistadors as  Juan Cocom , was a halach uinik (Mayan theocratic leader) of the Sotuta kuchkabal in modern day Yucatán, Mexico, and a descendant of the Cocom lineage that in previous centuries had led the League of Mayapan. He is notable for organizing armed resistance to the Spanish conquistadors under Francisco de Montejo the Younger, but was defeated in a battle at the ruins of T’ho in the center of modern day Mérida, Yucatán on June 10–11, 1542. He survived the battle and eventually submitted to Spanish rule, becoming baptized as Juan Cocom. He is considered by some to be the “last” halach uinik of the Maya, though the Itzá of Nojpetén resisted Spanish dominion until 1697.

References

Mayan chiefdoms of the Yucatán Peninsula